Linghai South railway station is a railway station in Linghai, Jinzhou, Liaoning, China. It opened with the Chaoyang–Linghai high-speed railway on 3 August 2021.

The station is an infill station on the Qinhuangdao–Shenyang high-speed railway and the southern terminus of the Chaoyang–Linghai high-speed railway.

See also
Linghai railway station

References

Railway stations in Liaoning
Railway stations in China opened in 2021